Arnold Abelinti (born 9 September 1991) is a French Guianan professional footballer who plays as a forward for Championnat National 2 club Olympique Alès and the French Guiana national team.

Career
Starting his career at Loiret-based side USM Olivet, Abelinti was spotted by then-Championnat National side US Orléans, and spent two seasons with the club's 'B' team, scoring an impressive 16 goals from 30 appearances.

He left in 2013, feeling betrayed by the Orléans club and moved to CFA 2 side Saint-Pryvé Saint-Hilaire. He had two spells there, scoring a total of 29 goals in 48 games, with a year at Limoges FC between them.

He returned to the CFA in 2016, signing with JA Drancy in July.

On 19 June 2019, Abelinti joined SO Romorantin.

International career
Abelinti made his debut in June 2016, scoring the second of a 3–0 win against Bermuda. In his second game, against St. Kitts & Nevis, he scored the game's only goal.

Career statistics

International

International goals
Scores and results list French Guiana's goal tally first.

References

External links
 
 Arnold Abelinti at CaribbeanFootballDatabase
 
 Arnold Abelinti at foot-national.com

1991 births
Living people
French Guianan footballers
French Guiana international footballers
French Guianan expatriate footballers
Expatriate footballers in France
Association football forwards
US Orléans players
Saint-Pryvé Saint-Hilaire FC players
Limoges FC players
JA Drancy players
SO Romorantin players
Olympique Alès players
Championnat National 2 players
Championnat National 3 players
2017 CONCACAF Gold Cup players
People from Kourou
People with vitiligo